The Zanuck Company (formerly The Zanuck/Brown Company) is an American motion picture production company. It is responsible for such blockbusters as Jaws, The Sting, Cocoon, Driving Miss Daisy, Charlie and the Chocolate Factory and Alice in Wonderland.

History

The Zanuck/Brown Company
In 1972, after a successful partnership at both 20th Century Fox and Warner Bros., Richard D. Zanuck and David Brown, left to form their own production company, The Zanuck/Brown Company. Later that year, Zanuck/Brown signed a five-year production deal with Universal Pictures.

In 1974, Zanuck/Brown produced The Sting, starring Paul Newman, Robert Redford, and Robert Shaw. The film won seven Academy Awards, including Best Picture.

In 1975, Zanuck/Brown produced Jaws, directed by Steven Spielberg and starring Roy Scheider, Robert Shaw, and Richard Dreyfuss. The film, which won three Academy Awards, became the first summer blockbuster. It was number 1 at the box office for fourteen consecutive weeks and made history as the first motion picture to gross more than $100 million.

In 1979, Lili Fini Zanuck joined the company and was instrumental in developing many of its future film projects.

In 1980, The Zanuck/Brown Company moved to 20th Century-Fox where it produced The Verdict, starring Paul Newman and James Mason, followed by Cocoon, directed by Ron Howard and starring Hume Cronyn, Brian Dennehy, Steve Guttenberg, Jessica Tandy, and Linda Harrison. On April 20, 1983, after he spent three years working at 20th Century-Fox, feeling it was "unhappy" with the agreement, the duo had moved to Warner Bros., and the new Zanuck-Brown agreement enabled the organization to produce two and a half films per year and the team will go directly to then-Warner executive Robert A. Daley. After three years working at Warner Bros., the duo shifted ties to production studio Metro-Goldwyn-Mayer, for an overall production agreement whereas the upcoming Z/B projects gave them access to MGM's slate.

The Zanuck Company
In 1988, Richard Zanuck partnered with producer/financier Jerry Perenchio and rebranded as The Zanuck Company.

In 1989, The Zanuck Company produced Warner Bros' Driving Miss Daisy, starring Morgan Freeman, Jessica Tandy, and Dan Aykroyd. The film won four Academy Awards, including Best Picture.

In 1994, The Zanuck Company produced Paramount's Deep Impact, starring Morgan Freeman, Robert Duvall, and Vanessa Redgrave. Other hits followed such as DreamWorks' Road to Perdition, starring Paul Newman, Tom Hanks, and Daniel Craig, 20th Century Fox's Planet of the Apes, starring Mark Wahlberg, Tim Roth, and Helena Bonham Carter, and Columbia Pictures' Big Fish, starring Ewan McGregor, Albert Finney, and Jessica Lange, the latter two films being directed by Tim Burton.

In 2004, Dean Zanuck formed Zanuck Independent to produce independent films. Productions under the division include Sony Picture Classics' Get Low, starring Robert Duvall, Sissy Spacek, and Bill Murray, and the sci-fi fantasy, The Zero Theorem, directed by Terry Gilliam and starring Christoph Waltz, Matt Damon, and Tilda Swinton.

Other productions by The Zanuck Company are Warner Bros' Charlie and the Chocolate Factory, Sweeney Todd: The Demon Barber of Fleet Street, Dark Shadows, and Alice in Wonderland, all of which were directed by Tim Burton and star Johnny Depp.

In 2010, Alice in Wonderland became the first motion picture from The Zanuck Company to exceed $1 billion at the box office.

In 2015, Dean Zanuck formed Zanuck Family Entertainment to produce family oriented motion pictures and multi-platform content. Disney veteran Rick Calabash was made head of the new division.

Filmography

Theatrical films

1970s

1980s

1990s

2000s

2010s

Television films/pilots

References

External links
Official website
The Zanuck Company on IMDb
Zanuck/Brown Productions on IMDb

1972 establishments in California
Film production companies of the United States
Mass media companies established in 1972
American companies established in 1972
Entertainment companies based in California
Entertainment companies established in 1972
Companies based in Beverly Hills, California